The Alamo Colleges District (previously the Alamo Community College District, or ACCD, and The Alamo Colleges) is a network of five community colleges in San Antonio and Universal City, Texas, and serving the Greater San Antonio metropolitan area. The district was founded in 1945 as the San Antonio Union Junior College District before adopting the Alamo name in 1982.

Colleges in the district
The five colleges in the district operate with a high degree of autonomy, though the colleges' accrediting agency, the Southern Association of Colleges and Schools, placed three in a year-long warning period from January 2017 over issues of institutional autonomy. The board of trustees for the district voted to rename the district in January 2017 to reflect issues pertaining to accreditation.

 San Antonio College (founded 1925)
 St. Philip's College (founded 1898)
 Palo Alto College (founded 1983)
 Northwest Vista College (founded 1995)
 Northeast Lakeview College (founded 2007)

All of the colleges are within San Antonio city limits except Northeast Lakeview, which is within the town limits of Universal City and Live Oak, just to the northeast of the City of San Antonio. The Alamo Colleges District Main Office is located at 2222 N. Alamo St. and was previously located in multiple offices throughout the city and in a portion of Universal City.

Education and programs
The district serves about 100,000 students in academic and continuing-education programs, employs about 5,300 faculty and staff, and had a budget of $277 million for 2009. The value of its endowment on June 30, 2011, was $11.9 million.

The district offers over 325 degree and certificate programs.  Most courses taken within the district are meant to apply to AA, AS, AAS, AAA, and AAT degrees, which help students apply for jobs or can be transferred to four-year institutions.

Service area

As defined by the Texas Legislature, the official service area of the Alamo Colleges District is:
all of Bandera, Bexar, Comal, Kendall, Kerr and Wilson Counties
all of Atascosa County excluding the portion included within the Pleasanton Independent School District
all of Guadalupe County excluding the portion of the county included within the San Marcos Consolidated Independent School District

References

External links
 

 
Universities and colleges in San Antonio
Community colleges in Texas